Amlash-e Shomali Rural District is a rural district (dehestan) in the Central District of Amlash County, Gilan Province, Iran. At the 2006 census, its population was 8,085, in 2,466 families. The rural district has 25 villages.

References 

Rural Districts of Gilan Province
Amlash County